Shannon Island is a large island in Northeast Greenland National Park in eastern Greenland, to the east of Hochstetter Foreland, with an area of . It was named by Douglas Charles Clavering on his 1823 expedition for the Royal Navy frigate HMS Shannon, a 38 gun frigate on which he served as midshipman under Sir Philip Broke.

The island is also home to many different types of animals such as polar bears, walruses, ravens, and oxen.

History
Most landmarks in the area were named by the Second German Polar Expedition under Carl Koldewey in 1869–70. Between October 1943 and June 1944, the German meteorological expedition Bassgeiger operated under difficult conditions at Kap Sussi on Shannon. Their ship Coburg was wrecked off Shannon. The station was discovered by hunters, but the crew was evacuated by air to Norway.

The island is the site of several hunter's cabins and is reputed to have especially favorable ice conditions.

Geography
Shannon Island is a coastal island, separated from Hochstetter Foreland in the mainland by the Shannon Sound, a 200 m deep sound of the Greenland Sea.

The islands that are located nearby are Kuhn Island to the southwest further inshore and the Pendulum Islands about 12 km to the south.

Image gallery

See also
List of islands of Greenland

References

Uninhabited islands of Greenland